Robin Wainwright (born 9 March 1951) is an English former footballer who played in the Football League for Cambridge United, Luton Town, Millwall and Northampton Town.

External links
 

English footballers
English Football League players
1951 births
Living people
Luton Town F.C. players
Cambridge United F.C. players
Millwall F.C. players
Northampton Town F.C. players
Association football midfielders